Carbondale station is an Amtrak intercity train station in Carbondale, Illinois, United States. Amtrak Thruway Motorcoach service between Carbondale and St. Louis, Missouri connects with the City of New Orleans. Carbondale is the southernmost Amtrak station in Illinois.

History

First station building
Illinois Central Railroad (IC) service to Carbondale began on July 4, 1854, with a wooden passenger depot.

Second station building

A new station building was built in 1903 as part of a series of improvements by the railroad in Carbondale, which included a roundhouse, office buildings, and a bandstand and park. Railway architect Francis T. Bacon designed the brick and limestone station.

The city of Carbondale purchased the former station from the IC in 1989; the exterior was restored in 1992, followed by the interior in 1996. The depot was added to the National Register of Historic Places on May 9, 2002 as the Illinois Central Railroad Passenger Depot. The building now houses the offices of Carbondale Main Street and Carbondale Chamber of Commerce.

Current Amtrak station building
Amtrak took over intercity passenger service from most private railroads, including the IC, on May 1, 1971. Initial Amtrak service to Carbondale was by the Chicago-New Orleans  (renamed  that November) and Chicago-Carbondale , each with one daily round trip. The City of New Orleans name returned in 1981. The current station shares characteristics with the standard designs of the Amtrak Standard Stations Program.

The Shawnee was merged with the Chicago-Champaign Illini on January 12, 1986; the Illini name was preserved with its terminus extended to Carbondale. A second daily Illini round trip, the Saluki, was added on October 30, 2006. The Saluki was named for the mascot of Southern Illinois University in Carbondale.

Planned new station building
In November 2019, the city was awarded a $14 million federal grant to construct the Southern Illinois Multi-Modal Station, which will replace the 1981-built station with a large train and bus depot on the same site. As of March 2022, it was claimed that 60% of the construction documents for the project had been completed, as had most approvals needed to construct a new facility (including approval by the Illinois Department of Transportation). On March 22m 2022, it was also decided by the Carbondale City Council to name the new station the "Southern Illinois Multimodal Station".

Early on, plans had called for a two-story structure, with the second floor being home to space for a work program. The work program space was moved to the first floor in design revisions which saw the plans change to a one story structure.

The design for the planned new station building has its main entrance at its southwest corner, accented by a structural tower. There will also a south entrance for easy access from the parking lot, and a west entrance fronting Illinois Avenue. There will also be a further entrance at the center of the building's west face, along Illinois Avenue. Features of the station will include a ticket desk and a baggage claim area. Per Amtrak's request, the station will also include a small fenced-in dog walking area near the train tracks for the convenience of those traveling on Amtrak with their pet dogs. The south side of the planned new facility will be the location for mass transit bus services. The northern side of the building will be occupied by offices for the Carbondale Chamber of Commerce, Carbondale Main Street, and a work program. The new station building is also planned to be home to Southern Illinois University's welcome center and the offices of the Carbondale Tourism agency. The new station building has been designed with an aim of achieving LEED Silver certification.

The new station building is planned to feature terrazzo flooring in its station areas. This flooring is planned to include a compass motif in the building's western vestibule and a two-dimensional representation of a geodesic dome at the southwest entrance as a tribute to the work of famous onetime Carbondale resident Buckminster Fuller. As a further tribute to Fuller, the eastern interior wall of the station facility will be adorned with Fuller's quote, "... to make the world work for 100% of humanity in the shortest possible time, through spontaneous cooperation, without ecological offences or disadvantage of anyone." The station is also intended to include displays related to Fuller provided by the R. Buckminster Fuller Dome Not-For-Profit, including photographs, paintings, and artifacts.

References

External links

Southern Illinois Multi-Modal Station
Trainweb USA Rail Guide: Carbondale, IL

Amtrak stations in Illinois
Railway stations in the United States opened in 1988
Transportation buildings and structures in Jackson County, Illinois

Railway stations on the National Register of Historic Places in Illinois
Railway stations in the United States opened in 1903
Railway stations closed in 1982
Former Illinois Central Railroad stations
National Register of Historic Places in Jackson County, Illinois
Railway stations in the United States opened in 1854